The 2020 Winter Youth Olympic Games, officially known as the III Winter Youth Olympic Games and commonly known as Lausanne 2020 (Italian and Romansh: Losanna 2020), was the third edition of the Winter Youth Olympics; a major international multi-sport event and cultural festival for teenagers that was held in Lausanne, Switzerland, the home of the International Olympic Committee, between 9 and 22 January 2020.

Bidding process 

The bidding calendar was announced by the IOC on 6 June 2013, with the application deadline set for 28 November 2013. Lausanne (Switzerland) and Brașov (Romania) were only two cities that submitted  the bids and were selected as the final candidates.

Host city selection 

The IOC voted to select the host city of the 2020 Winter Youth Olympics on 31 July 2015 at the 128th IOC Session at the Kuala Lumpur Convention Centre in Kuala Lumpur, Malaysia. Lausanne was selected by 71 votes to 10, as it got at least 41 votes needed for a majority.

Venues

Lausanne
 Vaudoise Aréna – Opening and closing ceremonies, Ice hockey finals
 CIG de Malley – Figure skating, Short Track
 Lausanne campus – Olympic village
 Le Flon – Medal ceremonies

Vallée de Joux
Prémanon, France – Ski jumping, Biathlon, Nordic Combined
Le Brassus – Cross-country Skiing

Alps
Leysin – Ski Freestyle (Halfpipe, Slopestyle), Snowboard (Halfpipe, Slopestyle)
Les Diablerets – Alpine skiing
Villars-sur-Ollon – Ski Cross, Snowboard Cross, Ski Mountaineering
Champéry, Valais – Curling
St. Moritz, Graubünden – Speed skating, Bobsleigh, Skeleton, Luge, Medal ceremonies

The Games

Sports
The Youth Olympic Games featured 8 sports and 16 disciplines. 81 events took place which included 13 mixed team events (NOCs), 34 men's events, and 34 women's events. Ski mountaineering and women's Nordic combined was featured for the first time in an Olympic event. A mixed-NOC 3-on-3 ice hockey tournament and a women's doubles event in luge were also contested for the first time.

Participating National Olympic Committees
A total of 1,788 athletes from 79 nations qualified, the most for any edition of a Winter Youth Olympics. 12 NOCs made their Winter Youth Olympics debuts: Albania, Azerbaijan, Ecuador, Haiti, Hong Kong, Kosovo, Pakistan, Qatar, Singapore, Thailand, Trinidad and Tobago, and Turkmenistan. Qatar and Turkmenistan have never competed at the Winter Olympics and Haiti  competed at the 2022 Winter Olympics.

Number of athletes by National Olympic Committee

Calendar
All dates are CET (UTC+1)

Medal table

Athlete Rolemodels

Records

Opening ceremony
The opening ceremony of the 2020 Winter Youth Olympic Games took place on the evening of Thursday 9 January 2020 at the Vaudoise Aréna, in Lausanne.

Closing ceremony
The closing ceremony of the 2020 Winter Youth Olympic Games took place on the evening of Thursday 22 January 2020 at the Medals Plaza Lausanne. The ceremony featured the flag handover from mayor of Lausanne Grégoire Junod to IOC President Thomas Bach and to the governor of Gangwon Choi Moon-soon as host of the 2024 Winter Youth Olympics and the extinguishing of the Youth Olympic flame.

Marketing

Mascot

Yodli the official mascot was unveiled on 8 January 2019 at CIG de Malley before match between Lausanne HC and HC Davos. Yodli is inspired by a combination of a cow, a Saint Bernard dog, and a goat, and was created by ERACOM. Blue represents the Swiss lakes.

Colours 
 Magenta, Sky Blue

Tickets
It was announced that all events apart from the opening ceremony would be free to watch in January 2020.

Media coverage
 - Eurosport
 - Mediacorp (delay)
 – Plan B
 - Unifi TV
 - Olympic Channel
 - Marca Claro (online), TUDN (Delay)
 - BBC iPlayer (online)

See also 
 Lausanne bid for the 2020 Winter Youth Olympics

References

External links
 
 Official IOC website
 
 
 
 Results Book

 
2020 in multi-sport events
2020
Olympic Games in Switzerland
2020 in Swiss sport
Youth sport in Switzerland
Sports competitions in Lausanne
Multi-sport events in Switzerland
Winter sports competitions in Switzerland
Switzerland at the Youth Olympics
2020 in youth sport
January 2020 sports events in Europe
2020 in winter sports